is the fourth single by Nogizaka46, released on December 19, 2012. It debuted in number one on the weekly Oricon Singles Chart. It also reached number one on the Billboard Japan Hot 100. The music video was directed by Kazuma Ikeda. He later directed the music video for Keyakizaka46 debut song Silent Majority.

Release 
This single was released in 5 versions. Type-A, Type-B, Type-C, a regular and anime edition. The first three editions are CD+DVD. The B-side track, "Yubi Bōenkyō", was used as the ending to the anime Magi: The Labyrinth of Magic.

The center position in the choreography for the title song is held by Rina Ikoma.

Track listing

Type-A

Type-B

Type-C

Regular Edition

Anime Edition

Chart and certifications

Oricon Charts

Certifications

References

Further reading

External links
 Discography on Nogizaka46 Official Website 
 
 Nogizaka46 Movie Digest on YouTube

2012 singles
Japanese-language songs
Nogizaka46 songs
Oricon Weekly number-one singles
Billboard Japan Hot 100 number-one singles
Songs with lyrics by Yasushi Akimoto
2012 songs
Songs written by Katsuhiko Sugiyama